NGC 706 is a spiral galaxy located in the Pisces constellation about 230 million light years from the Milky Way. It was discovered by the German–British astronomer William Herschel in 1786.

See also 
 List of NGC objects (1–1000)

References

External links
 

706
Spiral galaxies
Pisces (constellation)
006897